Cosmic Troubadour is the second solo album by bassist Billy Sheehan, formerly of Talas, David Lee Roth, and Mr. Big. Billy Sheehan sings and plays guitar in addition to his usual bass acrobatics.

Track listing
All tracks by Billy Sheehan

 "Toss It on the Flame" - 4:56
 "Back in the Day" - 5:00
 "The Suspense Is Killing Me" - 3:23
 "From the Backseat" - 5:37
 "Don't Look Down" - 3:40
 "Something She Said" - 2:47
 "Dreams of Discontent" - 5:10
 "Dig a Hole" - 3:06
 "Taj" - 3:42
 "The Lift" - 3:49
 "A Tower in the Sky" - 5:46
 "Long Walk Home" - 3:15
 "Indisputable Truth" - 3:00
 "Hope" - 4:52
 "A Million Tears Ago" (bonus track) - 6:23

Personnel
Billy Sheehan - bass, ultra bass, vocals, baritone 12 string electric guitar, baritone 6 string electric guitar, drum programming
Simone Sello - keyboards, drum programming, sampling
Ray Luzier - drums, drum programming

Notes

2005 albums
Billy Sheehan albums